General elections were held in Luxembourg on 1 February 1959. The Christian Social People's Party remained the largest party, winning 21 of the 52 seats in the Chamber of Deputies.

Results

References

Chamber of Deputies (Luxembourg) elections
Legislative election, 1959
Luxembourg
General election
Luxembourg general election